My Man Benny, My Man Phil is an album by saxophonist/composers Benny Carter and Phil Woods recorded in 1989 and released by the MusicMasters label.

Critical reception

AllMusic reviewer Scott Yanow stated "It is extremely difficult to believe that Benny Carter was 82 years old at the time of this recording, for his strong sound (nothing feeble about his playing) and fertile ideas on alto make him sound as if he were a contemporary of Phil Woods, who was born 24 years later. Together Carter and Woods form a mutual-admiration society ... A special and relaxed but occasionally hard-swinging date, this Music Masters CD is quite enjoyable".

Track listing

Personnel 
 Benny Carter – alto saxophone, trumpet, vocals
 Phil Woods – alto saxophone, clarinet
 Chris Neville – piano
 George Mraz – bass
 Kenny Washington – drums

References 

1990 albums
Benny Carter albums
MusicMasters Records albums